A House Without Boundaries is a 1972 Spanish drama film directed by Pedro Olea. It was entered into the 22nd Berlin International Film Festival.

Cast
 María Arias
 Charly Bravo
 Geraldine Chaplin
 Luis Ciges
 Jesús Fernández
 José Franco
 Tony Isbert
 William Layton
 Viveca Lindfors
 José Orjas
 Julio Peña
 Luis Peña
 Eusebio Poncela
 Margarita Robles
 Patty Shepard

References

External links

1972 films
1970s Spanish-language films
1972 drama films
Films directed by Pedro Olea
Films scored by Carmelo Bernaola
Spanish drama films
1970s Spanish films